Jeff Doyle may refer to:

 Jeff Doyle (baseball), former Major League Baseball second baseman
 Jeff Doyle (footballer), Australian association footballer (soccer) player
 Jeff Doyle (rugby league), Australian rugby league footballer